For the 1978 Tour de France, the following 11 teams each sent 10 cyclists, for a total of 110: Since the 1977 Tour de France, dominant riders as Eddy Merckx, Felice Gimondi, Raymond Poulidor and Luis Ocaña had retired.

Lucien Van Impe, the winner of 1976, had broken his collarbone and was still recovering.

The main contenders were debutant Hinault, who had won the 1978 Vuelta a España, and Joop Zoetemelk, who had already finished in second place for three times. Pre-race analysis judged Hinault better in the time trials, and Zoetemelk better in the mountains. Bernard Thévenet, the winner of the 1977 Tour de France, was out of form, and not considered a favourite.

Teams

 
 
 
 
 
 
 
 Lejeune–BP

Cyclists

By starting number

By team

By nationality

References

1978 Tour de France
1978